Michael Crockett (born 16 March 1983 in Sydney, Australia) is an Australian rugby league player. His position of choice is on the wing.

Early years
Michael started his rugby league career playing for the Nowra Warriors. He was then a junior at the St George Illawarra Dragons club for two years from 2003. In 2005 he moved to Melbourne and joined the Melbourne Storm. He spent one year with the Storm before moving to Sydney to join the Wests Tigers

Crockett made his first grade debut for the Wests Tigers in Round 1 of the 2006 season. He played in eight games for the club that year, scoring seven tries.

Warriors
The New Zealand Warriors then signed him on a two-year deal and he played 14 games for the Warriors in 2007. He was sent off in Round 12 while playing against the Canterbury Bulldogs for a high shot on Cameron Phelps.

When not selected by the Warriors Crockett played for the Auckland Vulcans in the NSW Cup and for the Counties Manukau Jetz in the Bartercard Cup.

On 13 August 2007 while in Sydney with the Warriors, he was charged with sexual assault by the New South Wales police. However the charges were later dismissed, after over a year of legal proceedings.

Crockett failed to impress in 2008, playing only six games for the club and often being overlooked for played such as Malo Solomona, Aidan Kirk and Manu Vatuvei. He was not offered a new contract by the club when his two-year deal expired.

Illawarra
Crockett joined Paul McGregor at the Western Suburbs Red Devils club in the Illawarra Rugby League competition. In 2012 he was called up to play for the Illawarra Cutters in the NSW Cup.

References

External links
Official Michael Crockett profile
NRL profile

1983 births
Living people
Auckland rugby league team players
Australian rugby league players
Counties Manukau rugby league team players
Illawarra Cutters players
New Zealand Warriors players
Rugby league players from Nowra, New South Wales
Rugby league wingers
Wests Tigers players